Vroom & Dreesmann (V&D) was a Dutch chain of department stores founded in 1887. It was declared bankrupt on  2015, although its branches were still in operation until  2016. On  2016, it was announced that takeover negotiations had not led to an agreement, ultimately resulting in the company's demise.

In 2015, V&D operated 67 branches throughout the Netherlands, three of which were branded as La Place, V&D's former subsidiary restaurant chain which had in-house and standalone restaurants throughout the country. The department stores sold, among others, clothing and shoes, jewelry, cosmetics, books, home-entertainment products, electric goods, stationery, cards and posters, furniture and homewares. Most branches also had a La Place in-house restaurant, a travel agent and an ATM. Larger branches also had a bakery.

Foundation and expansion, 1887–1972 
Vroom & Dreesmann was founded in 1887 by Willem Vroom and Anton Dreesmann. The first branch opened in Weesperstraat in Amsterdam.

The company expanded rapidly throughout the Netherlands until 1972.

Vroom & Dreesmann hits a plateau, 1972–2007 
Vroom & Dreesmann was reorganized into Vendex in 1972 and Vendex International in 1982. In 1987, the in-house restaurant chain La Place was opened. In 1988, Anton Dreesman was replaced as the company's CEO with Abraham Verhoef. In 1999, Vendex merged with Koninklijke Bijenkorf Beheer (KBB), the parent company of retail chains De Bijenkorf and Hema, and was renamed into Vendex KBB. It also inherited KBB's royal designation "Koninklijk".

In 2004, Vendex KBB was sold to a new investor group that included KKR, Alpinvest and Permira. It lost its royal designation as a result, yet was allowed to keep the K in its name. In 2005, Vendex KBB changed its name into Maxeda.

V&D, downfall and bankruptcy, 2007–2015 

In 2007, Vroom & Dreesmann was rebranded into V&D and the red, white and blue logo was replaced with a black logo. In 2008, the vd.nl website was launched. From 2010 to 2015, V&D was a subsidiary of Sun Capital Partners.

In February 2015, it was unclear whether V&D would continue to exist. Among the reasons mentioned for its demise:
 The rise of the internet with online shopping and the late start of V&D e-commerce.
 Cheaper brick and mortar stores such as the Swedish H&M and Irish Primark that competed successfully for V&D's market share.
 Lacking clear identity, in comparison with these affordable stores and the more exclusive ones, such as De Bijenkorf.
 The sale of the V&D real estate by the joint British-American ownership before Sun Capital, possibly increasing the warehouse's operational costs. The claim, that this was part of the problem, has been contested as, whether through capital costs or rent, real estate needs to be accounted for one way or another.

After negotiations, real estate owners agreed to reduce the area and costs of the rental properties, employees agreed to a gradual pay cut, and the V&D owners agreed to inject capital, but not the amount needed. Eventually, this problem was also resolved. In mid-March 2015, the rent reduction in Den Bosch and Heerlen remained unresolved. In May 2015, V&D kept working on reducing the rents and a new business plan, to be implemented in the short term, which aimed to make V&D profitable again in two years.

In December 2015, the firm was again under court protection for insolvency. The website no longer sold articles. V&D gift cards as well as air miles were no longer accepted for payment.
On 31 December 2015, V&D was declared bankrupt. The appointed liquidators kept the department stores open, pending restructuring and takeover talks with interested parties. On 26 January 2016, Supermarket chain Jumbo announced that it had acquired the subsidiary La Place. Talks continued for selling the stores that focused in February on Roland Kahn's retailer CoolCat. By 16 February, the negotiations for a takeover had broken down. About 10,000 employees lost their jobs.

Aftermath

Hudson's Bay, 2017–2019 
In V&D's latter days, Canadian retail group Hudson's Bay Company negotiated with the landlords to acquire most of the company's premises without having an interest in the company itself. In May 2016 Hudson's Bay Company (HBC) announced that it would take over up to 20 former V&D locations by 2017. HBC said the expansion would cost CAD $340 million and create 2,500 jobs in the stores and another 2,500 temporary construction jobs. The Dutch stores would operate under the "Hudson's Bay" and "Saks Off Fifth" brands.

As of mid-2019, Hudson's Bay Company still operated 15 stores in the defunct Vroom & Dreesmann locations. On August 31, 2019, the company announced that all 15 of those stores would close by year-end.

V&D web store, since 2018 

The brand name V&D was bought by entrepreneurs Ronald van Zetten, Roland Kahn, and Jaco Scheffers. In 2018 a web store with the V&D brand was opened.

References 

Retail companies established in 1887
Retail companies disestablished in 2016
Department stores of the Netherlands
Defunct retail companies of the Netherlands
Shops in Amsterdam
Dutch companies established in 1887
Dutch companies disestablished in 2016